Qeshlaq-e Pain (also Romanized as Qeshlāq-e Pā'īn and Qeshlāq Pā’īn; also known as Kishlaa-Ashagi, Qeshlāq Ashāqī, Qeshlāq Soflá, and Qishlāq Ashāghi) is a village in Mavazekhan-e Shomali Rural District, Khvajeh District, Heris County, East Azerbaijan Province, Iran. At the 2006 census, its population was 132, in 32 families.

References 

Populated places in Heris County